The 2019–20 Coupe de France preliminary rounds, Brittany was the qualifying competition to decide which teams from the leagues of the Brittany region of France took part in the main competition from the seventh round.

A total of fourteen teams qualified from the Brittany preliminary rounds. In 2018–19, AS Vitré progressed the furthest in the main competition, reaching the quarter-final before losing to Nantes.

Schedule
The first two rounds of the qualifying competition took place on the weekends of 25 August and 1 September 2019. 558 clubs entered in the first round, with 111 from Régional 3 (tier 8) and the rest from the district leagues (tier 9 and below). 22 Régional 3 and 59 Régional 2 clubs entered in the second round. 

The third round draw took place on 3 September 2019. 20 teams from Régional 1 (tier 6) and the 12 teams from Championnat National 3 (tier 5) joined the competition at this stage.

The fourth round draw was published on 18 September 2019. Four teams from Championnat National 2 (tier 4) joined the competition at this stage. 55 ties were drawn.

The fifth round draw was published on 2 October 2019. The single team from Championnat National (tier 3) joined the competition at this stage. 28 ties were drawn.

The sixth round draw was published on 17 October 2019. 14 ties were drawn.

First round
These matches were played on 24 and 25 August 2019.

Second round
These matches were played on 30 August and 1 September 2019.

Third round
These matches were played on 14 and 15 September 2019.

Fourth round
These matches were played on 28 and 29 September 2019.

Fifth round
These matches were played on 12 and 13 October 2019.

Sixth round
These matches were played on 26 and 27 October 2019.

References

Preliminary rounds